Haikū Valley is an amphitheater-shaped valley on the windward side of the Koolau Range behind Kāneohe, Oahu in the Hawaiian Islands. The valley was the site of a United States Navy radio transmitting station (later taken over by the Coast Guard as an OMEGA Navigation System station) and is part of the route of Hawaii's Interstate H-3. 

The Haikū Stairs (also known as "Stairway to Heaven") is a foot trail of over 3,000 metal stairs ascends to Puu Keahiakahoe, a  peak above the east valley wall. The stairs were originally constructed as a means of reaching the radio antenna attachment points high on the surrounding ridge line. The Haikū Stairs are closed to the public, although people still illegally trespass to experience the nearly two-hour climb. 

The facility initially was built following the attack on Pearl Harbor as a means of communicating with U.S. Navy ships as far away as Tokyo Bay. The facility had a massive antenna system consisting of five massive cable antennas draped from atop one mountain ridge, and across the mountain valley to the top of the other ridge. The ridges formed a horseshoe shape around the valley. The natural height of the mountain ridges made for an excellent means of having an elevated antenna system. The construction and use of the facility was initially a classified military secret.

The building was designed to withstand a 500 lb. bomb being dropped on the top of the building, allowing people inside to survive.

References

External links
http://www.haikustairs.org/ The friends of Haikū Stairs website

Valleys of Hawaii
Landforms of Oahu